The Central African mud turtle (Pelusios chapini) is a species of turtle in the family Pelomedusidae. The species is endemic to Central Africa.

Etymology
The specific name, chapini, is in honor of American ornithologist James Paul Chapin.

Geographic range
Pelusios chapini is found in the Central African Republic, the Democratic Republic of the Congo, Gabon, the Republic of the Congo, and Uganda

References

Bibliography

Further reading
Laurent RF (1965). "A contribution to the knowledge of the genus Pelusios (Wagler)". Annales du Musée Royal de l'Afrique Centrale, Tervuren, Belgique, Sciences Zoologiques, Eighth Series 135: 1-33. (Pelusios castaneus chapini, new subspecies, p. 21).

Central African mud turtle
Reptiles of Central Africa
Reptiles of the Democratic Republic of the Congo
Reptiles of the Republic of the Congo
Reptiles of the Central African Republic
Reptiles of Gabon
Reptiles of Uganda
Central African mud turtle
Taxa named by Raymond Laurent